Kim Mun language (金门方言) is a Mienic language spoken by 200,000 of the Yao people in the provinces of Guangxi, Hunan and Yunnan, with about 61,000 of the speakers in Hainan Province.

Iu Mien and Kim Mun are very similar to each other, having a lexical similarity percentage of 78%.

Distribution
In China, Kim Mun is spoken in the following counties (Mao 2004:304-305).

Yunnan: Hekou, Malipo, Maguan, Xichou, Qiubei, Guangnan, Funing, Yanshan, Shizong, Jiangcheng, Mojiang, Yuanyang, Jinping, Lüchun, Mengla, Jinghong
Guangxi: Xilin, Lingyun, [[Napo, [[Tianlin, Fengshan, Bama, Lipu, Pingle, Mengshan, Jinxiu, Yongfu, Luzhai, Fangcheng, Shangsi
Hainan: Qiongzhong, Baoting, Qionghai, Tunchang, Ledong, Wanning, Yaxian
Hunan: Unknown

Ethnologue lists several counties in Vietnam where Kim Mun is spoken. The Van Ban district of Lao Cai province is perhaps the primary area. In Vietnam, Dao people belonging to the Quần Trắng, Thanh Y, and Áo Dài subgroups speak Kim Mun.

Notes

References

Clark, Eddie. (2008). A phonological analysis and comparison of two Kim Mun varieties in Laos and Vietnam (Master's thesis). Payap University.
Phạm Văn Duy. 2014. Văn hóa dân gian Kinh Môn. Hanoi: Nhà xuất bản văn hóa thông tin. 
Phan Hữu Dật & Hoàng Hoa Toàn. 1998. "Về vấn đề xác minh tên gọi và phân loại các ngành Dao Tuyên Quang." In Phan Hữu Dật (ed). Một số vấn đề về dân tộc học Việt Nam, p.483-567. Hà Nội: Nhà xuất bản Đại Học Quốc Gia Hà Nội.
Shintani Tadahiko. 1990. The Mun language of Hainan Island : its classified lexicon [海南島門語: 分類詞滙集]. Tokyo: ILCAA.
Shintani Tadahiko. 2008. The Mun language of Funing County: its classified lexicon. Tokyo: ILCAA.

External links
Asia Harvest. (N.d.) "People Group Profiles: Kim Mun". Retrieved 12 June 2019.

Hmong–Mien languages
Languages of China